The Ice Hockey Queensland, currently trading as Ice Hockey Q is the governing body of ice hockey in Queensland, Australia. The Ice Hockey Queensland is a branch of Ice Hockey Australia.

History

Queenslands first ice rink
To build the first ice skating venue for Queensland saw failed attempts and proposals, dating back to 1938, with the proposal of an ice skating rink on Wickham Street, Brisbane. The proposal was submitted by C. V. E. Mitchell for a dual purpose venue that would hold ice skating during the winter season and roller skating during the summer season. A few months later the formation of Brisbane Ice Skating Palais Ltd. was made 5 November 1938 who stated that they expected to open the new rink 1 May 1939. Closer to the proposed opening date for the ice rink, it was announced that the development plans for the proposed new ice skating rink were under reconstruction and details could not be given on 17 February 1939.

The first ice skating rink built in Queensland was proposed by Sir Oswald Stoll and built by an English refrigeration engineer, Mr. C. N. Pugh, who arrived on Friday 17 November 1939 along with 4 engineers to construct the rink as part of a traveling show in the  His Majesty's Theatre in Brisbane. The show was a production called Switzerland, which had traveled through England and Africa with these same engineers and equipment. This rink was not a public ice skating rink and was only used for the season for the production where champion ice skaters Phil Taylor and Megan Taylor headlined.

In 1947, secretary of the Queensland branch of the Pedal Cyclists' Association, Les Cecil proposed a dual purpose venue as a solution which would see cycling in the summer season on a removable floor so that ice skating could be enjoyed when the floor was removed for the winter season.

In 1953 a construction engineer named Mr. W. J. Newton was to finish plans for 3 pools to be built on his land opposite the Mount Gravatt showgrounds. The proposal was to include an Olympic swimming pool, Olympic diving pool and a shallow children's pool. To also be built near the pools were 4 tennis courts, mini golf course and an ice skating rink.

The first public ice rink in Queensland was Mowbray Park Ice Rink which opened in 1958 and it was here that ice hockey began for Queensland. The rink was built in the former Mowbray Park Picture Palace and lasted 7 seasons until it closed in 1967.

National Competition

Goodall Cup
In 1977, Queensland won their first Goodall Cup and were the first state to win the Goodall Cup other than Victoria and New South Wales since the inaugural inter-state competition in 1909.

Leagues
Brisbane United Ice Hockey League is featuring teams from Southern Stars, Brisbane Buccaneers and Gold Coast Grizzlys with teams competing in five different divisions based on skill level.

SuperLeague – The top senior league in Queensland
Senior Division I – Non Checking Adult League
Senior Division II – Non Checking Adult League Division 2
Midgets – junior league open to players 18 and under
Peewee – junior league open to players 13 and under

Uniform and Logos

Presidents
 1988 - Dr. Kelly Armatage

See also

Ice Hockey Australia
Australian Women's Ice Hockey League
Australian Junior Ice Hockey League

References

External links
 Official site
Legends of Australian Ice

Queensland
Sports governing bodies in Queensland
1960 establishments in Australia
Sports organizations established in 1960